Clarence Grenville Spencer (5 August 1909 – 1979) was an English footballer who played in the Football League for Port Vale, Barrow and Carlisle United.

Career
Spencer played for Butler's Hill and was on Birmingham's books, though without appearing for the first team, before joining Second Division side Port Vale in June 1930. After making his debut at the Old Recreation Ground in a 2–0 win over Swansea Town on 11 October 1930, he became a first team regular. He scored his first goal in the Football League seven days later, in a 3–0 win over Reading at Elm Park. However, after breaking an ankle on 26 January 1931, in a 3–1 home defeat to Everton, he lost his place to Dennis Izon and failed to win it back upon his recovery. He played just four games the next season and was given a free transfer in May 1932. He moved on to Norwich City, Barrow and Carlisle United.

Career statistics
Source:

References

1909 births
1979 deaths
People from Gedling (district)
Footballers from Nottinghamshire
English footballers
Association football wingers
Birmingham City F.C. players
Port Vale F.C. players
Norwich City F.C. players
Barrow A.F.C. players
Carlisle United F.C. players
English Football League players